Secretary of State for Foreign and Commonwealth Affairs v Yunus Rahmatullah [2012] UKSC 48 is a UK constitutional law case concerning the detention of Yunus Rahmatullah, a Pakistani citizen detained in Iraq, and later Afghanistan, who is alleged to have travelled to Iraq to fight for Al-Qaeda during the Second Iraq War.

Background
Yunus Rahmatullah is a Pakistani citizen who was suspected of having travelled to Iraq to become a fighter for Al-Qaeda. He was detained in Iraq by British Special Air Service (SAS) forces in 2004, during the United States' occupation of Iraq. He was transferred to US military custody. Initially, the US authorities held him in a prison in Iraq, but subsequently, he was transferred to a US-operated prison in Afghanistan without the knowledge of the UK government. These actions were contrary to a 2003 memorandum of understanding between the US and UK, which provided that persons captured in Iraq by the UK and later transferred to US custody could not be subsequently taken out of Iraq without agreement from the UK and that detained persons captured by the UK and transferred to US custody would be returned to the UK upon UK request. On behalf of Rahmatullah, lawyers from the human rights group Reprieve argued that the UK government should apply pressure on the US government to release him and that a writ of habeas corpus ad subjiciendum et recipiendum issued by the Court of Appeal should apply to him based on the memorandum of understanding. Lawyers for the UK government argued that they had no power to direct the United States to release Rahmatullah.

Judgment
The Supreme Court ruled that the detention of Rahamatullah at the US Bagram prison in Afghanistan was unlawful and at least prima facie a breach of Article 49 of the Geneva Convention.

However, by a 5-2 majority the Supreme Court of the United Kingdom dismissed the appeal of the human rights group Reprieve, stating:

However, in a dissenting judgment Lady Hale and Lord Carnwath stated:  "Where liberty is at stake, it is not the court's job to speculate as to the political sensitivities which may be in play."

Criticism
Writing in The Guardian the journalist and lawyer Joshua Rozenberg praised the dissenting judgment of Lady Hale and Lord Carnwath, arguing that the British government should have tried harder to secure Yunus Rahmatullah's release. Mr Rahmatullah remained in detention in Afghanistan at Bagram Air Base until his release on 15 May 2014.

References

External links
Press Summary
Judgment
Court of Appeal judgment

Supreme Court of the United Kingdom cases
2012 in case law
Iraq War legal issues
Habeas corpus
Internments
2012 in British law
United Kingdom constitutional case law